Asclepiades of Samos (Sicelidas) (born c. 320 BC) was an ancient Greek epigrammatist and lyric poet who flourished around 270 BC.  He was a friend of Hedylus and possibly of Theocritus. He may have been honoured by the city of Histiaea in about 263 BC.

Asclepiades was the earliest and most important of the convivial and erotic epigrammists. Only a few of his compositions were intended as actual inscriptions, if any. Other poems sing the praises of those poets whom he especially admired, but the majority of his work that has survived is love songs. It is doubtful whether he is the author of all the epigrams (some 40 in number) which bear his name in the Greek Anthology. He has been credited with creating the metre which bears his name, the Asclepiad metre.

The sole source for the known, unlacunaed epigrams of Asclepiades is the Greek Anthology. Most of Asclepiades's epigrams appear in both of the two principal Byzantine epigram collections that constitute the Greek Anthology: the Palatine Anthology and the Planudean Anthology.  Epigrams xxxix and xliii appear only in the Planudean Anthology, which is the less complete of the two so far as the epigrams of Asclepiades are concerned, all the rest are in the Palatine Anthology. Some papyri have been recovered that contain portions of known epigrams and portions of otherwise unknown epigrams attributed to Asclepiades.

Editions
  with commentary in ii pp. 114–151.
  Translated by Alexander Sens

Notes

External links
 Asclepiades: translation of all surviving epigrams at attalus.org; adapted from W.R.Paton (1916–18)

 
 

Ancient Samians
3rd-century BC Greek people
3rd-century BC poets
Ancient Greek lyric poets
Epigrammatists of the Greek Anthology
Year of birth unknown
Year of death unknown
Year of birth uncertain